Mississippi Highway 540 (MS 540) is a state highway through Simpson and Smith counties in central Mississippi.

Route description
The western segment of MS 540 begins in the unincorporated community of Harrisville at an intersection with MS 469. The two-lane road heads through some curves descending in elevation, but eventually settles on an easterly course. MS 540 heads through wooded areas passing a few houses that were built along old alignments of the road. Changing to a slight east northeast heading, the highway crosses through wooded terrain with some rolling hills. The road's course changes back to due east as it changes its name to Jupiter Road and enters the town of D'Lo. After passing some houses, MS 540 crosses a railroad before the state highway ends at an intersection with MS 149 and East 4th Street.

MS 540's eastern segment begins at a T-intersection with MS 149 southeast of downtown Mendenhall, but still within the city limits. The road heads northeast and almost immediately intersects U.S. Route 49 (US 49), a divided highway. It changes to a more easterly course making severa; reverse curves as it heads through wooded areas. At the community of Martinville, the road reaches a four-way all-way stop intersection with MS 541. Immediately past this intersection, state maintenance of MS 540 ends and the road is county maintained for the next . Continuing east, MS 540 heads through a mix of woods and open fields passing some houses along the way. The road curves to the northeast and enters Smith County. At the community of Traxler, the road heads through more rolling hills, passes a few churches, and crosses Oakohay Creek. MS 540 enters the city of Raleigh and shortly after crossing into city limits, state maintenance again ends. Heading past small houses, the highway, known as Cohay Road, heads east. Before reaching MS 35, the road makes a sharp curve to the north and then ends at a skewed intersection with MS 35.

History
The first section of MS 540 formally designated as a part of the state highway system occurred in 1958. Dating back to 1956, a portion of current MS 540 west of Raleigh was part of MS 543. Originally, MS 540 had only run from MS 541 at Martinsville to a junction with MS 543 west of Raleigh. By 1960, MS 540 had taken over the state highway to Raleigh (MS 543 had been completely decommissioned) and along a newly designated highway west to US 49 in Mendenhall. This portion along former US 49 was removed from MS 540 when MS 149 was formally designated.

The western segment of MS 540 between Harrisville and D'Lo was created along some existing roads and newly constructed roads. Though part of the state highway system, the work was performed by Simpson County. The highway was completed in October 2006.

Major intersections

References

External links

540
Transportation in Simpson County, Mississippi
Transportation in Smith County, Mississippi